"That's the Way Love Is" is a single released by R&B singer Bobby Brown in 1993 on the MCA Records label. The official music video for the song was directed by Andy Morahan.

Track listing
 "That's the Way Love Is" (12-inch extended club version) – 6:47
 "That's the Way Love Is" (Ragamuffin Dub) – 7:18
 "That's the Way Love Is" (Guitarappella) – 6:29

Charts

Weekly charts

Year-end charts

References

1992 songs
1993 singles
Bobby Brown songs
MCA Records singles
Music videos directed by Andy Morahan
Song recordings produced by Teddy Riley
Songs written by Bobby Brown
Songs written by Teddy Riley